Kupirovo is a village in Croatia. It is connected by the D218 highway.

Population

According to the 2011 census, Kupirovo had 46 inhabitants.

Note: In census years 1857-1880 it include data for the settlement of Kunovac Kupirovački.

1991 census

According to the 1991 census, settlement of Kupirovo had 130 inhabitants, which were ethnically declared as this:

Austro-hungarian 1910 census

According to the 1910 census, settlement of Kupirovo had 469 inhabitants in 2 hamlets, which were linguistically and religiously declared as this:

Literature 

  Savezni zavod za statistiku i evidenciju FNRJ i SFRJ, popis stanovništva 1948, 1953, 1961, 1971, 1981. i 1991. godine.
 Book: "Narodnosni i vjerski sastav stanovništva Hrvatske, 1880-1991: po naseljima, author: Jakov Gelo, izdavač: Državni zavod za statistiku Republike Hrvatske, 1998., ;

References

Populated places in Zadar County
Lika
Serb communities in Croatia